Ofelia Manibog Samar-Sy is a Filipino physician in Internal medicine and Cardiology, medical educator, Medical Director of Ibalong Medical Center in Legazpi City, Albay, in May 2014 she was appointed Dean, College of Medicine of Bicol Christian College. She is currently the Dean of Bicol University College of Medicine.

Education
In 1994 she was named an Associate Fellow of the Philippine Heart Association Philippine College of Cardiology. In May 1994 she became a Diplomate in Internal Medicine given by the Philippine College of Physicians.

Public service
Samar-Sy is a researcher and community volunteer in Bicol where she leads and coordinates for various local and national organizations such as A.G.A.P.P. Foundation (Aklat, Gabay, Aruga tungo sa Pag-angat at Pag-asa), Yellow Boat of Hope Foundation, Albay Medical Society, Pinoy Power Bicol Coalition, Inc. (PPBCI), and the People Power Volunteers for Reform (PPVR).

Currently she is the Dean of Bicol University College of Medicine.

Selected publications

References

External links
 Masbate Yellow Boat Project-RTVM

1962 births
Living people
People from Legazpi, Albay
Filipino philanthropists
People from Camarines Sur
Fellows of the American College of Cardiology